Josepmir Aarón Ballón Villacorta (born 21 March 1988) is a Peruvian footballer who plays for Alianza Lima and the Peru national football team, as a defensive midfielder.

Club career
Ballón began his career with Academia Deportiva Cantolao and in January 2007 joined Universidad San Martín where he made his debut in the Torneo Descentralizado. On 26 June 2010 the midfielder left Universidad San Martín and was loaned out to River Plate.

In January 2015, Ballón joined Sporting Cristal. On 7 February, he scored in his debut for the Torneo Descentralizado against Deportivo Municipal; it was the 2-0.

International career
Ballón played for the Peru national under-17 football team the 2005 FIFA U-17 World Championship in Peru. He has earned 29 caps while a member of the Peru national team.

Honours

Club
Universidad San Martín
 Peruvian Primera División (2): 2007, 2008, 2010
Sporting Cristal
 Peruvian Primera División (2): 2014, 2016
Alianza Lima
 Peruvian Primera División (2): 2021, 2022

Country
Peru national football team
 Copa America: Bronze medal 2011
 Copa America: Bronze medal 2015
 Copa America: Runner up 2019

Personal life
Ballón is currently married and has two children.

References

External links
 
 
 

Living people
1988 births
Footballers from Lima
Peruvian footballers
Peru international footballers
Peruvian expatriate footballers
Academia Deportiva Cantolao players
Club Deportivo Universidad de San Martín de Porres players
Club Atlético River Plate footballers
Sporting Cristal footballers
Universidad de Concepción footballers
Club Alianza Lima footballers
Chilean Primera División players
Peruvian Primera División players
Argentine Primera División players
Association football midfielders
2011 Copa América players
2015 Copa América players
2019 Copa América players
Peruvian expatriate sportspeople in Argentina
Peruvian expatriate sportspeople in Chile
Expatriate footballers in Argentina
Expatriate footballers in Chile